WKXM-FM (97.7 FM, "Gold 97.7") is a radio station licensed to serve Winfield, Alabama, United States.  The station is owned by Ad-Media Management Corp.

WKXM-FM broadcasts an oldies music format which features programming from ABC Radio.

History
This station received its original construction permit for a new FM radio station broadcasting with 3,000 watts of effective radiated power at 105.9 MHz from the Federal Communications Commission on February 22, 1990.  The new station was assigned the call letters WXZX by the FCC on March 20, 1990. While still under construction, the station changed callsigns on October 1, 1990, to the current WKXM-FM as a complement to their AM sister station now known as WKXM.  WKXM-FM received its license to cover from the FCC on May 1, 1992.

WKXM was formerly located at 105.9 FM but, for technical reasons that involved other radio stations, a 2004 frequency change was required.

References

External links

KXM-FM
Oldies radio stations in the United States
Radio stations established in 1991
Marion County, Alabama